André Jouve, born 1929, died 2 March 2019 was a French conductor and radio producer, active mainly in France, who left a number of recordings and was for many years associated with classical music on French Radio.

Life and career 
Jouve studied at the Conservatoire de Paris, and took a keen interest in baroque music in the 1950s, and notably recorded Charpentier's Messe de minuit with the Ensemble vocal de Paris, which won a Grand Prix du disque in 1954. He conducted in Paris and Stuttgart including the Orchestre de la Société des Concerts du Conservatoire. Jouve was the chorus director for the 1952 Aix-en Provence festival production of Iphigénie en Tauride, conducted by Carlo Maria Giulini, later recorded for Vox Records.

He joined the ORTF in 1969, becoming head of the musical research group (GRM) which had been founded by Pierre Schaeffer in 1958. Five years later he was running the Orchestre lyrique and the Orchestre de chambre of the ORTF which lasted until 1975. He was later the administrator of Radio France's Nouvel Orchestre Philharmonique and from 1981 he was coordinator of programming and music services at France Musique. After leaving Radio France he was part of a working group of the European Broadcasting Union. He was President of the Centre National d'Artistes Lyriques (CNIPAL) from 1995 to 2005..

Recordings 
Jouve's recordings include the following works, with record company labels and year given where available:
 Bach - Concertos for harpsichord, Nos. 3 & 7 (Stuttgart Opera Orchestra, Frank Pelleg) Ducretet Thomson
 Bartok - Sonata for Two Pianos and Percussion, Divertimento for String Orchestra (Stuttgart Opera Orchestra, Geneviève Joy, Jacqueline Bonneau, Pierre Naudin, Jean-Claude Tavernier) Ducretet-Thomson 
 Marc-Antoine Charpentier - Messe de Minuit (Ensemble Vocal de Paris) Ducretet Thomson, 1954 
 Delibes - Lakmé, three extracts (Orchestre des Concerts Lamoureux, Pierrette Alarie) Philips 1956 
 Dvorak - Cello Concerto and Slavonic Dances 4 & 5 (South West German Rundfunk Baden-Baden, Guy Fallot) Ducretet-Thomson, 1950s
 Hahn - Mozart (Orchestre des Concerts Francais) Ducretet-Thomson
 Hossein - Piano concerto N° 2, Miniatures persanes, Estampe japonaise (Orchestre du Théâtre des Champs-Élysées, Geneviève Joy) Ducretet-Thomson 1956
 Mozart - opera and concert arias, from Die Zauberflöte, Exultate Jubilate, Le Nozze di Figaro, Popoli di Tessaglia!, Die Entführung aus dem Serail, Il re pastore (Orchestre du Théâtre des Champs-Élysées, Pierrette Alarie) Ducretet-Thomson Records 
 Mozart - arias from Idomeneo ('Zeffiretti lusinghieri' and 'Se il padre perdei') and Die Zauberflöte ('Ach, ich fühl's, es ist verschwunden') (Teresa Stich-Randall, Orchestre du Théâtre des Champs-Élysées de Paris) Telefunken TW 30 055
 Prokofiev - The Ugly Duckling, Op. 18, Overture On Hebrew Themes, Op. 34, Summer Day Suite, Op. 65a (Orchestre du Théâtre des Champs-Élysées, Françoise Ogéas) Ducretet-Thomson 1956
 Jean-Féry Rebel - Les Éléments (Orchestre Lyrique de l'ORTF) Office de Radiodiffusion-Télévision Française (ORTF) 1974 
 Vivaldi - Concertos for Bassoon, Flute and Oboe (Nouvel Orchestre de Chambre de Paris) Ducretet Thomson, 1954
 Vivaldi - Gloria Mass (Ensemble Vocal de Paris, Orchestre de la Société des Concerts du Conservatoire) Ducretet Thomson, 1954 
 French Renaissance Choral Music (Ensemble Vocal de Paris) Ducretet Thomson
 Music by Benhamou, Fortner, Bosseur (Ensemble Instrumental de Royaumont) Royaumont, 1967

References 

1929 births
French classical musicians
French male conductors (music)
2019 deaths
20th-century French conductors (music)
20th-century French male musicians